Diduga plumosa is a moth of the family Erebidae. It is found on Sumbawa.

References

Nudariina
Moths described in 1911